James William Morris (born 23 November 2001) is an English professional footballer currently playing as a defender for Watford.

Club career

Morris signed his first professional contract with Southampton in August 2020, having been with his boyhood club since joining at Under-10's. 

On 4 June 2021, Southampton announced their retained list which confirmed Morris had been released.

Having impressed while on trial, Morris signed for Watford on a one-year contract with the option of another year on 2 August 2021. 

Morris made his professional debut in the FA Cup third round against Leicester City on 8 January 2022, playing the full 90 minutes in a 4–1 defeat.

In March 2022, Morris signed a new two-year deal with the club.

Morris made his first appearance of the 2022–23 season when coming on as a second half substitute in a 2–0 home defeat to MK Dons in the second round of the EFL Cup on 23 August 2022.

Career statistics

Club
.

References

2001 births
Living people
English footballers
Association football defenders
Southampton F.C. players
Watford F.C. players